I'm a Celebrity... Get Me out of Here! returned to ITV for a sixth series on Monday 13 November 2006 and ran until Friday 1 December 2006. Once again the series was hosted by Ant and Dec.

Kelly Osbourne and Brendon Burns initially presented the ITV2 spin-off show I'm a Celebrity... Get Me Out of Here! with Burns broadcasting from London, and Osbourne from Australia. However Burns was later replaced by Mark Durden Smith, and Osbourne was joined by Steve Wilson, and later Jeff Brazier.

The I'm a Celebrity...Exclusive teatime programme ran on weekdays on ITV1. It was hosted by Series 5 contestant Sheree Murphy and Phillip Schofield. The series was won by Matt Willis on Day 19.

Iceland, the supermarket, replaced First Choice Holidays as the shows' sponsor.

Celebrities
Twelve celebrity contestants participated in the sixth series.

Camps
On Day 8, the camp was split in two for the first time in I'm A Celebrity history and took part in a 'Battle of The Sexes' like competition. Team Base Camp consisted of David, Dean, Jason, Matt, Scott and Toby. Team Snake Rock consisted of Faith, Jan, Lauren, Malandra, Myleene and Phina.

The two teams competed in Bushtucker Trials for food, and in Celebrity Chests for treats and other luxury items. The final head to head trial was to win immunity from the first elimination. The girls won, meaning the men faced the public vote. Toby was eventually evicted.

The first competitive Celebrity Chest, contested between Matt & Scott of Team Base Camp and Lauren & Phina of Team Snake Rock ended in controversy when Scott and Phina fought over the chest, resulting in Phina biting Scott.

Results and elimination

Notes
 On Day 18, there was a double elimination. First the hosts revealed that Dean had the fewest votes and he was eliminated. The phone lines were reopened for the other contestants, and later the hosts returned to camp to reveal that David now the fewest votes, and he was also sent home.

Bushtucker Trials
The contestants take part in daily trials to earn food. The participants are chosen by the public, up until the first eviction, when the campers decide who will take part in the trial

 The public voted for who they wanted to face the trial
 The contestants decided who did which trial
 The trial was compulsory and neither the public or celebrities decided who took part

Notes
 For the trial, Scott had to dance to 10 songs whilst bugs were dropped on his head. Scott danced to one song before shouting "I'm A Celebrity...Get Me out of Here!". This is often touted as the worst ever performance in a Bush Tucker Trial.

 The public were asked to choose between two new campers, Dean and Malandra. Whoever the public voted for would take part in the trial and enter the camp.

 The public voted for Phina to take part in the trial. She was allowed to choose the second person to take part. She chose Jason.

 Upset at the prospect of taking part in the Trial, Jan was allowed to take one campmate to the trial for support. She chose Jason.

 This was the first head to head trial.

 The winner of the trial won immunity from the first vote off for their camp. Snake Rock won, meaning the male campers faced the public vote.

 David did not attend the trial, so his stars were taken by Myleene & Matt.

Star count

References

External links
 
 
 I'm a Celebrity... Get Me out of Here! at Biogs.com

2006 British television seasons
06